Crambidia uniformis, the uniform lichen moth, is a moth of the family Erebidae. It was described by Harrison Gray Dyar Jr. in 1898. It is found from eastern North America, including Alabama, Florida, Georgia, Indiana, Iowa, Kentucky, Maryland, North Carolina, Ohio, Oklahoma, South Carolina, Tennessee and West Virginia.

The wingspan is 12–18 mm.

References

Lithosiina
Moths described in 1898